Pallavi is an Indian feminine given name that may refer to
 Pallavi (actress), Indian actress and producer
 Pallavi Aiyar, Indian journalist and author
M. D. Pallavi Arun, Indian singer 
Pallavi Batra (born 1989), Indian actress
Pallavi Gungaram (born 1993), Mauritian beauty pageant titleholder
 Pallavi Joshi, Indian actress and model 
 Pallavi Kulkarni, Indian television actress
Pallavi Purohit, Indian actress
Pallavi Ramisetty, Indian actress
 Pallavi Seshayyar (1842–1909), composer of Carnatic music
 Pallavi Sharda, Indian-Australian actress and dancer
 Pallavi Subhash, Indian soap opera actress
 Pallavi Subhash Chandran, Indian television actress 

Indian feminine given names